Tianjin Maritime Court (天津海事法院) is a maritime court with jurisdiction of all matters of national and international Maritime law. The Court was the first of the ten specialized  maritime courts set up in China in 1986, and it has jurisdiction over all port, coasts islands and sea of Tianjin Municipality and Hebei Province in an area delimited by a line between the junction of Hebei Province and Liaoning Province and a line from the junction between Hebei Province and Shandong Province. The Tianjin Maritime Court is a middle-level court, and it falls under the appellate jurisdiction of Tianjin Higher People's Court

The court deals specifically with all forms of contracts, torts, offenses and crimes under maritime law, including hearing cases of maritime trade contracts, bills of lading, common average, marine insurance disputes, maritime arbitration award recognition and enforcement (which the court refers to a subordinate court set up in Qinhuangdao.), maritime transport, salvage, marine insurance, marine environmental damage, marine exploration and development, port operations, port warehousing, shipping and freight forwarders and other types of cases.

The court has a good reputation as equitable and efficient, and it is a favorite venue for pollution cases due to its perceived friendliness to suitors, independence and its willingness to apply innovative interpretations of the appropriate statutes, but it still suffers from the common problems of lack of follow-through and enforcement powers, and vulnerability to corruption.

References

Admiralty courts
Tianjin
1986 establishments in China
Courts and tribunals established in 1986